Events from the year 1834 in art.

Events
October 16 – Burning of Parliament in London witnessed by J. M. W. Turner, John Constable and Augustus Pugin

Works

Paintings
Carl Blechen – The Interior of the Palm House on the Pfaueninsel Near Potsdam
Thomas Cole – The Savage State and The Arcadian or Pastoral State from The Course of Empire
Eugène Delacroix – The Women of Algiers
Edward Hicks – Peaceable Kingdom
Jean Auguste Dominique Ingres – The Martyrdom of Saint Symphorian (Autun Cathedral)
Thomas Luny – Battle of the Nile, August 1st 1798 at 10 pm
John Martin – The Deluge
J. M. W. Turner – The Fountain of Indolence

Prints
Hiroshige – The Sixty-nine Stations of the Kiso Kaidō (publication begins)
Hokusai – One Hundred Views of Mount Fuji

Sculptures
Francis Chantrey – Memorial to Mary Anne Boulton (Great Tew church, Oxfordshire)
Antoine-Augustin Préault – The Killing (Musée des Beaux-Arts, Chartres)

Births
February 15 – Paul Guigou, French painter (died 1871)
February 28 – Léon Bonvin, French painter and watercolorist (died 1866)
May 9 – Alexander Calandrelli, German sculptor (died 1903)
July 4 – Christopher Dresser, British designer influential in the Anglo-Japanese style (died 1904)
July 6 – Joseph Boehm, Austrian-born sculptor (died 1890)
July 10 – James McNeill Whistler, American-born painter (died 1903)
July 19 – Edgar Degas, French painter and sculptor (died 1917)
August 2 – Frédéric Bartholdi, French sculptor of the Statue of Liberty (died 1904)
December 9 – Leopold Müller, German-born Austrian painter (died 1892)
date unknown
Caspar Buberl, American sculptor (died 1899)
Percy Hetherington Fitzgerald, Irish-born literary biographer, drama critic and sculptor (died 1925)

Deaths
 January 4 – Mauro Gandolfi,  Italian painter and engraver of the Bolognese School (born 1764)
 January 31 – Zacarías González Velázquez, Spanish painter (born 1763)
 February 26 – Alois Senefelder, German actor, playwright and inventor of lithography (born 1771)
 March 30 – Rudolph Ackermann, German-born printer and lithographer (born 1764)
 March 31 – Landolin Ohmacht, German sculptor (born 1760)
 April 27 – Thomas Stothard, English painter and engraver (born 1755)
 June 4 – Robert Bowyer, English miniature painter and publisher (born 1758)
 August 7 – William Birch, English miniature painter and engraver (born 1755)
 c. August 13 – Peter Rindisbacher, Swiss-born painter in the United States (born 1806)
 December 3 – Ferdinand Runk, German-Austrian landscape painter, draftsman and etcher (born 1764)
 December 17 – Henry Bone,  English enamel painter (born 1755)
 December 22 – Prince Hoare, English painter and dramatist (born 1755)
 date unknown
 Samuel Elmgren, Finnish painter (born 1771)
 Vicente Escobar, Cuban painter (born 1757)
 Anne Forbes, Scottish portrait painter (born 1745)
 Ulrika Melin, textile artist, member of the Royal Swedish Academy of Art (born 1767)

References

 
Years of the 19th century in art
1830s in art